Denver Jay Hume (born 11 August 1998) is an English professional footballer who plays as a left-back for  club Portsmouth. He previously played for Sunderland.

Career
Born in Ashington, Hume joined Sunderland's academy at the age of 10, and made his debut for Sunderland in the final match of the 2017–18 season as a second-half substitute in a 3–0 victory over Wolverhampton Wanderers. He scored his first goal for Sunderland on 11 January 2020 in a 4–0 victory over Wycombe Wanderers.

Hume joined another EFL League One club, Portsmouth, on 26 January 2022 for an undisclosed fee. He signed a two-and-a-half-year contract with the option of an additional year. He scored his first goal for the club on 22 February 2022 in a 2-1 win against Shrewsbury Town.

Career statistics

Honours
Sunderland
EFL Trophy runner-up: 2018–19

References

1998 births
Living people
English footballers
Association football defenders
Sunderland A.F.C. players
Portsmouth F.C. players
English Football League players